Pike Central High School is located in Petersburg, Indiana and is the only public high school in Pike County. It was formed in 1974 by the consolidation of Petersburg High School, Otwell High School, and Winslow High School.

Athletics
Pike Central High School's athletic teams are nicknamed the Chargers, and it participates in the Pocket Athletic Conference.

Notable achievements

In October 2010 Pike Central High School was selected as one of 14 Lemelson-MIT "InvenTeams" and one of only four teams to present on stage at the convention. The program grants selected high schools up to $10,000 to invent technological solutions to real-world problems. More than 1,200 schools applied for the grant, and a judging panel of educators, researchers, alumni and staff from MIT; industry experts; and past Lemelson-MIT Award winners selected Pike Central High School as one of the grantees. It is the first Indiana school to be picked for the program.  The Pike Central High School InvenTeam has built a lightweight disaster relief shelter that is both inexpensive and easy to assemble and disassemble. Made from corrugated polypropylene sheets, the shelter also has a water filtration system, and the team is currently working to add an alternative energy source to supply light to the structure.

See also
 List of high schools in Indiana
 Pocket Athletic Conference
 Petersburg, Indiana

References

External links
Official Website
Facebook
Twitter

 

Pocket Athletic Conference
Education in Pike County, Indiana
Buildings and structures in Pike County, Indiana
Public high schools in Indiana
1974 establishments in Indiana